Ankara DSİ Era Gençlik ve Spor Kulübü, more commonly known as Ankara DSİ or Mamak Belediyesi Ankara DSİ Era is a Turkish professional basketball club based in Mamak, Ankara which plays Turkish Basketball League (TBL). The team was founded by State Hydraulic Works in 2011. Their home arena is Mamak Belediyesi Sports Hall with a capacity of 4,250 seats. The team sponsored by Mamak Municipality and ERA Group of Companies.

Season by season

Source: Eurobasket.com

Notable players

 Jason Clark

External links 
 Ankara DSİ Spor, Official Website
 Mamak Belediyesi Ankara DSİ ERA Website
 Eurobasket.com Page
 Facebook Page of Ankara DSİ Sports Club
 Official Twitter Page of Ankara DSİ Sports Club

Basketball teams in Turkey
Basketball teams established in 1960
Sports teams in Ankara